Banzai is a 1918 American short film starring Sessue Hayakawa and produced by his Haworth Pictures Corporation.

References

External links 
 

1918 films
Haworth Pictures Corporation films
American silent short films
American black-and-white films
1910s American films